Since the year 2000, a number of Kuiper belt objects (KBOs) with diameters of between 500 and 1500 km (more than half that of Pluto) have been discovered. 50000 Quaoar, a classical KBO discovered in 2002, is over 1000 km across.  and , both announced on 29 July 2005, are larger still. Other objects, such as 28978 Ixion (discovered in 2001) and 20000 Varuna (discovered in 2000) measure roughly 500 km across. This has led gradually to the acceptance of Pluto as the largest member of the Kuiper belt.

The brightest known dwarf planets and other KBOs (with absolute magnitudes < 4.0) are:

See also
 List of trans-Neptunian objects

References

List of the brightest KBOs
Lists of trans-Neptunian objects
Kuiper belt objects, brightest